WEES-LP (107.9 FM) is a non-commercial radio station licensed to serve Ocean City, Maryland.  The station is owned by Edinboro Early School Inc. It airs a Variety format featuring educational programs, oldies music, community affairs programs, and other locally produced programs. WEES-LP maintains a public studio in the Gold Coast Mall on the Coastal Highway in Ocean City.

The station was assigned the WEES-LP call letters by the Federal Communications Commission on April 25, 2001.

See also
List of community radio stations in the United States

References

External links
WEES-LP official website
 
WEES-LP service area per the FCC database

EES-LP
EES-LP
Community radio stations in the United States
Worcester County, Maryland
Ocean City, Maryland